Aldo Curti (born 12 March 1926) is an Italian retired professional football player.

Curti played one game in Serie A, for A.S. Roma in the 1947/48 season.

External links
Profile at Enciclopediadelcalcio.it

1926 births
Possibly living people
Italian footballers
Serie A players
Montevarchi Calcio Aquila 1902 players
A.S. Roma players
Parma Calcio 1913 players
Association football midfielders
Sportspeople from Arezzo
Footballers from Tuscany